Epimelitta eupheme is a species of beetle in the family Cerambycidae. It was described by Lameere in 1884.

References

Epimelitta
Beetles described in 1884